The following is a list of notable people associated with Swarthmore College, a private, independent liberal arts college located in the borough of Swarthmore, Pennsylvania. 

Since its founding in 1864, Swarthmore has graduated 156 classes of students. As of 2022, the College enrolls 1,689 students and has roughly 21,300 living alumni. 

As of spring 2022, Swarthmore employs nearly 200 faculty members.

Nobel laureates
Listed chronologically by year of the award.

MacArthur Fellows
Listed chronologically by year of the grant.

List of alumni
Listed in alphabetical order by surname.

Architecture
Frances Halsband (1965) - FAIA, former Dean of School of Architecture at Pratt Institute
Margaret Helfand (1969)- FAIA (attended 1965–68)
Steven Izenour (1962)
Marianne McKenna (1972) - RIBA

Arts, film, theatre, and broadcasting
Joseph Altuzarra (2005) – fashion designer, winner of the 2011 CFDA/Vogue Fashion Fund Award
Lisa Albert (1981) – television producer and writer, Mad Men, Beautiful People, Living Single, Becker, Murphy Brown, Major Dad
Mark Alburger (1979) – composer; founder / music director of San Francisco Composers Chamber Orchestra; music director of Goat Hall Productions; founder / editor-publisher of 21st-Century Music.
Miyuki Baker (2012) – mixed-media artist and activist
Peter Bart (1954) – Vice President and Editor-in-Chief of Variety
Al Carmines (1958) – composer of Off-Broadway musicals; pastor
Bruce Cratsley (1966) - American photographer specialized in still lifes, portraits of friends, and gay life in New York City
Marshall Curry (1992) – documentary filmmaker of Street Fight, If a Tree Falls: A Story of the Earth Liberation Front, Racing Dreams,  and Point and Shoot; 2006 Oscar nominee for Documentary Feature; 2006 News & Documentary Emmy Award nominee for Outstanding Continuing Coverage of a News Story: Long Form; 2012 Oscar nominee for Documentary Feature, Academy Award-winning short film The Neighbors' Window (2019).
David Dye (1972) – radio personality and host of the World Cafe
Michael Forster Rothbart (1994) – photojournalist
 John Freeman (1996) – Writer, literary critic and former editor of the literary magazine Granta and executive editor at Alfred A. Knopf.
Steven Gilborn (1969) – Actor
Alexandra Grant (1994) – visual artist
Evan Gregory (2001) – member of The Gregory Brothers (creators of Auto-tune the News)
Steven Izenour (1962) – architect; co-author of Learning from Las Vegas
Grant S. Johnson (2014) - filmmaker
Nicholas Kazan (1969) – screenwriter
H. C. Robbins Landon (1946) – musicologist
Stephen Lang (1972) – Tony Award-nominated actor and playwright; star of Avatar, Gods and Generals, Gettysburg, Tombstone, and Terra Nova   
Cynthia Ling Lee - dancer, choreographer, and dance scholar
Michael Lessac (1961) - theater, television, and film director and screenwriter.
David Linde (1982) – Executive Producer of Crouching Tiger, Hidden Dragon and Y Tu Mamá También; co-founder of Focus Features; Co-Chair of Universal Studios
Beth Littleford (3 yrs) – former Daily Show correspondent, Comedy Central personality, and actress, Dog With a Blog
Dana Lyons (1982) – independent singer/songwriter
Richard Martin (1967) – art and fashion historian; former Curator-in-Chief of the Costume Institute at the Metropolitan Museum of Art
Sabrina Martinez (1992) - Audio Describer
François Picard (journalist) (1988) a dual national Franco-American journalist who hosts the English language France focused (a) current affairs talk show The Debate and (b) journalist roundtable discussion show The World This Week
Dawn Porter (1988) – documentary filmmaker, director of Gideon's Army, nominee for News & Documentary Emmy Award
Ike Schambelan (1961) – founder, Theater Breaking Through Barriers in New York City
Peter Schickele (1957) – composer, often under the comic pseudonym P. D. Q. Bach
Aaron Schwartz (1970) – actor, director and copyright lawyer in Toronto
Tom Snyder (1972) – founder of Soup2Nuts (formerly Tom Snyder Productions) animation studio; co-creator and Executive Producer, Dr. Katz, Professional Therapist; Executive Producer, Home Movies
Robert Storr (1972) – Dean of the Yale School of Art; curator; painter; critic; director of Venice Biennale 2007
Darko Tresnjak (1988) (1988) – Director, Artistic Director of the Old Globe Shakespeare Festival in San Diego; CA; 2014 Tony Award winner for Best Direction of a Musical, A Gentleman's Guide to Love and Murder
Kenneth Turan (1967) – movie reviewer, Los Angeles Times  
Robert C. Turner (1969) – ceramic artist
Michael J. Weithorn (1978) – television producer and writer, The King of Queens, Family Ties, Ned & Stacey, The Goldbergs
Paul Williams (1969) – founder and publisher of Crawdaddy!
Jenny Yang – writer and comedian, majored in Political Science.
Michał Zadara (1999) – Polish theatre director
Don Mizell (1971) - Music executive & Producer, 2005 Grammy Album of the Year winner for Ray Charles’ “Genius Loves Company”.

Business
 Charles Andes – chairman of the Franklin Institute science museum in Philadelphia and Chairman of the Pennsylvania Academy of Fine Arts
 Peter Cohan (1979) – President, Peter S. Cohan & Associates 
David L. Cohen (1977) – American businessman, attorney, lobbyist, and diplomat who is (as of March of 2023) the United States ambassador to Canada who previously served as (a) senior executive vice president, chief lobbyist, and the senior advisor to the CEO of Comcast Corporation and (b) chairman of the board of trustees for the University of Pennsylvania and (c) chief of staff to former Philadelphia Mayor Ed Rendell 
 John Diebold (1949) – founder of Diebold Group, Diebold, Inc., and The Diebold Institute for Public Policy
 John D. Goldman (1971) – CEO, Richard N. Goldman & Co. Insurance Services; President, San Francisco Symphony
 Jerome Kohlberg, Jr. (1946) – billionaire (Forbes 400 Richest in America); co-founder, Kohlberg Kravis Roberts & Co.
 Frederick W. Kyle (1954) – Chairman, BioRexis Pharmaceutical Corporation
 Eugene M. Lang (1938) – founder of REFAC Technology Development Corporation, philanthropist
 Nick Martin (2004) – founder and CEO of TechChange
 Thomas B. McCabe (1915) – Chairman, the Board of Governors of the Federal Reserve, President, Scott Paper
 Arthur S. Obermayer (1952) – founder of the Moleculon Research Corporation; Jewish-American philanthropist. 
 Thomas Rowe Price, Jr. (1919) – founder of T. Rowe Price
 Kate Warne (1976) – Principal, Investment Strategist, Edward Jones Investments
 Robert Zoellick (1976) – former president of the World Bank
 Danna Azrieli - Chairwoman of Azrieli Group

Economics
Dean Baker (1981) – macroeconomist; co-founder and co-director of the Center for Economic and Policy Research
Robert Cooter (1967) – scholar in law and economics, Professor at UC Berkeley School of Law
Andre Gunder Frank (1950) – German-American economic historian and sociologist; developer of dependency theory
Diana Furchtgott-Roth (1979) – former Chief Economist of the United States Department of Labor, former chief of staff of President George W. Bush's Council of Economic Advisers, senior fellow at the Manhattan Institute
Michael Greenstone (1991) – 3M Professor of Environmental Economics at MIT, director of the Hamilton Project
Kevin Hassett (1984) - economic adviser to four Republican presidential candidates; chair of the Council of Economic Advisers, 2017-2019
Pinar Karaca-Mandic (1998) – Health economist and Professor of Management at Carlson School of Management
Peter J. Katzenstein (1967) – Walter S. Carpenter, Jr. Professor of International Studies at Cornell University; member of the Council on Foreign Relations
Clark Kerr (1932) – industrial economist, first chancellor of University of California, Berkeley, twelfth president of the University of California
William N. Kinnard (1947) – former Director of the Institute of Urban Research; Founding Director of the Center for Real Estate and Urban Economics; leading author, lecturer, and expert on the topic of real estate valuation; his text, Income Property Valuation, published in 1971, is still considered a classic in the field
Arnold Kling (1975) – founder and co-editor of EconLog, a popular economics blog
Linda Datcher Loury (1973) – noted Social Economist and professor at Tufts University
Thomas Bayard McCabe (1893-1982) – Chairman of the Federal Reserve Board (1948-1951)
Jeffrey Miron (1979) –  chairman of the Department of Economics at Boston University, 1992-1998; director of undergraduate studies in the Harvard University Department of Economics, director of economic studies at the Cato Institute
Karen Pence (1992) - Deputy Associate Director of the Federal Reserve Board of Governors
William Poole (1959) – eleventh president of the Federal Reserve Bank of St. Louis
Edward C. Prescott (1962) – winner of 2004 Nobel Memorial Prize in Economics
Iqbal Quadir (1982) – founder of Gonofone and GrameenPhone; founder and Director of the Legatum Center for Development and Entrepreneurship at MIT
Sam Schulhofer-Wohl (1998)  – Senior Vice President and Director of Financial Policy of the Federal Reserve Bank of Chicago
Hans Stoll (1962) – The Anne Marie and Thomas B. Walker, Jr. Professor of Finance and Director of the Financial Markets Research Center at Vanderbilt University's Owen Graduate School of Management; former president of American Finance Association
Peter Temin (1959) – economic historian, Elisha Gray II Professor of Economics at Massachusetts Institute of Technology
Christopher Udry (1981) – King Professor of Economics at Northwestern University; co-founder and co-director of the Global Poverty Research Lab at the Kellogg School of Management
E. Roy Weintraub (1964) – Professor of Economics at Duke University focusing on the history of the interconnection between mathematics and economics in the twentieth century
Martin Weitzman (1963) – Environmental economist and Professor of Economics at Harvard University
Gavin Wright (1965) – Economic historian and Professor of Economics at Stanford University

Education
Patrick Awuah, Jr. (1988) – founder, Ashesi University, Ghana's first liberal arts college
David Baltimore (1960) – President of Caltech; Nobel Prize winner 
Nancy Y. Bekavac – first female president of Scripps College
Detlev W. Bronk – former president, Johns Hopkins University
William Boulding (born 1955), dean of the Fuqua School of Business at Duke University
Kimberly Wright Cassidy – President, Bryn Mawr College
David L. Cohen (1977) – served as chairman of the board of trustees for the University of Pennsylvania
Paul Courant – Provost, University of Michigan
Sean M. Decatur – President, Kenyon College
Christopher Edley, Jr. – Dean of University of California, Berkeley School of Law
Neil R. Grabois – former Provost, Williams College; former president, Colgate University
Tori Haring-Smith – President, Washington and Jefferson College
Rachel Jacobs (1997) CEO of ApprenNet and social activist
John H. Jacobson – former president, Hope College
Clark Kerr – first Chancellor, the University of California, Berkeley and 12th President, the University of California
Sara Lawrence-Lightfoot (1966) – Emily Hargroves Fisher Professor of Education at Harvard Graduate School of Education; Chairman of the Board, John D. and Catherine T. MacArthur Foundation; first African-American woman in Harvard University's history to have an endowed professorship named in her honor
Richard Wall Lyman – former president (7th), Stanford University
Christina Hull Paxson (1982)- President-elect (19th), Brown University
David H. Porter (1958) – former president, Skidmore College
Robert Prichard – former president (13th), University of Toronto
Kevin Quigley - Former President, Marlboro College
Lawrence Schall (1975) – President, Oglethorpe University
Alan Valentine – former president, University of Rochester
Helen Magill White – first woman in the US to earn a Ph.D.
Phyllis Wise – Provost, University of Washington
Mary Schmidt Campbell – President, Spelman College

Historians
Margaret Lavinia Anderson – University of California, Berkeley
Pamela Kyle Crossley – Dartmouth College
Philip Curtin – Distinguished professor of African history, Johns Hopkins University
Jonathan Dewald – SUNY Distinguished Professor of History, State University of New York at Buffalo
Linda Gordon – New York University (NYU)
Linda Grant DePauw  – George Washington University
Daniel Headrick - Roosevelt University
Pieter M. Judson – Swarthmore College
Thomas Laqueur – University of California, Berkeley
David Montgomery – Yale (emeritus)
John H. Morrow Jr. – University of Georgia at Athens
William Rubinstein - Deakin University, University of Wales
Nayan Shah – University of California at San Diego
Gavin Wright – Stanford University
Tara Zahra – University of Chicago

Humanities and law
T. Alexander Aleinikoff (1974) – Dean, Georgetown University Law Center (law school)
Elizabeth S. Anderson (1981) – John Dewey Distinguished University Professor of Philosophy and Women's Studies, University of Michigan
Adrienne Asch (1946-2013) – founding director of the Center for Ethics at Yeshiva University
Ellen Ash Peters (1951) – Chief Justice, Connecticut Supreme Court  
Leo Braudy (1963)  – University and Leo S. Bing Professor of English and American Literature, University of Southern California
Peter Berkowitz – The Tad and Dianne Taube Senior Fellow at Stanford University's Hoover Institution
Anne Pippin Burnett (class of 1946) - American classical scholar best known for her work on Greek literature, especially tragedy and the lyric poetry of the archaic and early classical periods
Cora Diamond – Emeritus Professor of Philosophy, University of Virginia
Frank H. Easterbrook (1970) – Judge, United States Court of Appeals for the Seventh Circuit
Christopher Edley, Jr. (1973) – Dean, University of California, Berkeley School of Law
Marjorie Garber – Director, the Humanities Center at Harvard University; Shakespeare scholar; cultural critic
Allan Gibbard – Professor of Philosophy (ethics), University of Michigan
Ruth Wilson Gilmore  – abolitionist and prison scholar
Michael Hardt – Professor of Literature, Duke University; author of Empire.
Gilbert Harman – Professor of Philosophy (metaphysics, epistemology, ethics, philosophy of language, philosophy of mind), Princeton University
Geoffrey C. Hazard Jr., law professor
James C. Hormel (1955) – former dean, University of Chicago Law School
Ray Jackendoff – Professor of Linguistics – Tufts University
David Lewis –  Professor of Philosophy (philosophical logic, philosophy of language, philosophy of mind, metaphysics, epistemology, ethics), Princeton University
Wilma A. Lewis (1978) – former United States Attorney, District of Columbia
Eben Moglen (1980) – professor of law and legal history, Columbia University; general counsel and board member at the Free Software Foundation; co-author of the original GNU General Public License
Alexander Nehamas – Professor of Humanities and Comparative Literature (Greek philosophy, philosophy of art), Princeton University
Alexander Mitchell Palmer (1891) – United States Attorney General (1919–1921)
Barbara Partee – Emeritus Professor of Linguistics and Philosophy, University of Massachusetts Amherst
Jed S. Rakoff (1964) – legal scholar, judge on the United States District Court for the Southern District of New York
Charles F.C. Ruff (1960) – Special Prosecutor during the Watergate scandal, defender of Anita Hill during confirmation hearings for Clarence Thomas, counsel to President Bill Clinton during the Lewinsky scandal
Mary M. Schroeder (1962) – Chief Judge, United States Court of Appeals for the Ninth Circuit
Stewart J. Schwab (1975) – Dean and Professor of Law, Cornell Law School
Mark D. Schwartz (1975) – attorney in private practice; former first vice president of Prudential-Bache Securities's public-finance department
Herbert W. Smyth (1876) – Professor of Classics whose comprehensive grammar of Ancient Greek has become a standard reference
Peter Unger – Professor of Philosophy (epistemology, metaphysics), New York University
Christina Crosby – Professor of English Literature, Professor of English, Feminist, Gender, and Sexuality Studies, Wesleyan University

Natural science, medicine, and engineering
 Ted Abel – Professor of Biology at the University of Pennsylvania.
Margaret Allen  – first female heart transplant surgeon
Dave Bayer – math consultant, A Beautiful Mind
Christopher F. Chyba – Professor at Princeton University
Paul Crowell – Professor of Physics, University of Minnesota
Bruce T. Draine – astrophysicist; author of "Physics of the Interstellar and Intergalactic Medium"; Professor of Astrophysical Sciences at Princeton
Sandra Moore Faber – astronomer, member of the National Academy of Sciences and the American Academy of Arts and Sciences, diagnosis and repair of the Hubble Space Telescope's spherical aberration, design of the DEep Imaging Multi-Object Spectrograph (DEIMOS) for the Keck Telescope on Mauna Kea in Hawaii
Neil Gershenfeld – Associate Professor of Media Arts and Sciences at MIT, director of MIT's Center for Bits and Atoms
William H. Green - Hoyt C. Hottel Professor of Chemical Engineering at MIT.
 Frank Hastings Griffin (1910), chemist who invented Rayon. 
Rush Holt Jr. - CEO of the American Association for the Advancement of Science.
John J. Hopfield – Professor of Molecular Biology at Princeton University; member of the National Academy of Sciences, the American Academy of Arts and Sciences and the American Philosophical Society
Alexander Huk – Professor of Neuroscience and Director of the Center for Perceptual Systems at the University of Texas at Austin.
Tyler Lyson (2006) – curator of vertebrate paleontology at the Denver Museum of Nature and Science
Robert MacPherson (1966) – mathematician at the Institute for Advanced Study and Princeton University; National Academy of Sciences Award in Mathematics (1992); Leroy P. Steele Prize (2002, with Goresky); Heinz Hopf Prize (2009)
Holbrook Mann MacNeille – mathematician; professor; Scientific Director of the Office of Scientific Research and Development; chief of the Fundamental Research Branch of the United States Atomic Energy Commission
John C. Mather – Senior Astrophysicist, Infrared Astrophysics Branch at NASA/Goddard Space Flight Center; 2006 Nobel laureate in physics for his work on the cosmic microwave background
Rogers McVaugh – professor of botany; UNC herbarium's curator of Mexican plants; Adjunct Research Scientist of the Hunt Institute in Carnegie Mellon University; Professor Emeritus of botany in the University of Michigan, Ann Arbor
Newton Morton – population geneticist, one of the founders of the field of genetic epidemiology
Ted Nelson – computer visionary; coined the term "hypertext"
Marcella Nunez-Smith – physician, co-chair of president Joe Biden's COVID-19 Advisory Board and leader of task force on health equity
Frank Oski – Director of Pediatrics at Johns Hopkins School of Medicine
G. Raymond Rettew – chemist; pioneered mass production of penicillin during World War II
Sally Ride – astronaut and physicist, first American woman in space, attended for three semesters
Nancy Roman – astronomer; one of "the inspirational women" of NASA
Anne Schuchat – Acting Director of the National Center for Infectious Diseases (NCID), Centers for Disease Control (CDC)
Maxine Frank Singer – biochemist, president of the Carnegie Institution of Washington since 1988
Charlotte Moore Sitterly – astronomer; identified chemical elements in the sun using spectroscopy
Karen Strier – professor of biological anthropology at the University of Wisconsin–Madison
Daniel F. Styer (Ph.D. 1983) - professor of physics at Oberlin College
Joseph Takahashi – neuroscientist at Northwestern University; member of the National Academy of Sciences; Howard Hughes Medical Institute investigator; identified key genes involved in mammalian circadian rhythms
Emma Vyssotsky - astronomer at the University of Virginia
Peter J. Weinberger – computer scientist; former head of CS Research at Bell Labs; inventor of the AWK programming language

Politics and government
Kyle Anderson – Executive Director at Congressional Black Caucus
Samuel Assefa – Ethiopian Ambassador to the United States
Erica Barks-Ruggles – U.S. Ambassador to Rwanda
Paul Booth – Labor leader, executive assistant to the president of AFSCME
William H. Brown, Jr. – parliamentarian, the United States House of Representatives
Armond Budish – Democratic Minority Leader of Ohio House of Representatives
Dennis Cheng – national finance director of the 2016 presidential campaign of Hillary Clinton  
David L. Cohen (1977) – American businessman, attorney, lobbyist, and diplomat who is (as of March of 2023) the United States ambassador to Canada 
Scott Cowger – Democratic state legislator from Maine
Peter Deutsch – Democratic member of the House of Representatives, 1993–2005; represented Florida's 20th congressional district
Michael Dukakis – Governor of Massachusetts; Democratic nominee in the 1988 presidential election
Christiana Figueres – Executive Secretary of the UN Framework Convention on Climate Change (2010–2016)
Robert P. George – member, President's Council on Bioethics; professor, Princeton University
Josh Green – 14th Lieutenant Governor of Hawaii
Rush Holt Jr. – Congressman from New Jersey, 1999 - 2015
Kevin Hassett – chair of the Council of Economic Advisers, 2017-2019
Leon Henderson – administrator of the Office of Price Administration, 1941-1942
James Hormel – former ambassador to Luxembourg, first openly gay U.S. Ambassador
Eugene M. Lang – philanthropist, founder of the I Have A Dream Foundation; 1996 recipient of the Presidential Medal of Freedom
Thomas B. McCabe – Chair of the Federal Reserve Board of Governors, 1948-1951, and recipient of the Medal of Merit for his government work during World War II.
Carl Levin – Democratic U.S. Senator from Michigan
 Mary B. Newman – Republican member of the Massachusetts House of Representatives, 1953–1954 and 1957–1970
Alice Paul – women's suffrage leader from 1913 onwards, author of first Equal Rights Amendment proposal
Amos J. Peaslee – politician, author, and United States Ambassador to Australia, 1953-1956
Robert D. Putnam – social capital theorist, author of Bowling Alone, Harvard University professor
Antoinette Sayeh – Minister of Finance, Liberia
William C. Sproul – 27th governor of Pennsylvania
Chris Van Hollen – Democratic United States Senator from Maryland
Phil Weiser – 39th Colorado Attorney General, 
Cathy Wilkerson – radical activist and former member of the Weather Underground, known for being present at the 1970 Greenwich Village townhouse explosion
James Morrison Wilson, Jr. – career diplomat; Foreign Service officer; Deputy Assistant Secretary of State for East Asia and Pacific; U.S. Deputy Representative for Micronesian Status Negotiations; Department of State Coordinator for Humanitarian Affairs (1975–1977)
Carl Wittman – writer, LGBT rights activist and member of the national council of Students for a Democratic Society
Molly Yard – former president of the National Organization for Women

Psychology
Adele Diamond – pioneer in developmental cognitive neuroscience; professor at The University of British Columbia
Eugene Galanter – pioneer in cognitive psychology and psychometrics; Professor Emeritus, Columbia University
Carol Gilligan – recipient of Grawemeyer Award; professor at New York University
Rachel Hare-Mustin – feminist psychologist; Parliamentarian of the American Psychological Association
Isabel Myers – co-creator of the Myers-Briggs Type Indicator  
Robert Rescorla – co-creator of the Rescorla-Wagner model; professor at University of Pennsylvania

Sports
Ed Ayres (1963) – ultramarathon runner; winner of JFK 50 Mile; editor and publisher of Running Times magazine
Robin Carpenter (2014) – professional road cyclist
Ben Clime – NFL player
Eran Ganot - college basketball head coach (University of Hawaii)
Dick Hall – former Major League Baseball pitcher; appeared in three World Series for the Baltimore Orioles, 1969–71
Ladule Lako LoSarah – international footballer for the Republic of South Sudan
Morgan Langley – player with the Philadelphia Union in Major League Soccer
Lee MacPhail - President of the American League (MLB), 1973-1984
Tiny Maxwell – College Football Hall of Fame player and referee
Curly Ogden - Major League Baseball pitcher
Jack Ogden - Major League Baseball pitcher

Writers, journalists, and publishers

Eliot Asinof –writer, especially about baseball
Ed Ayres – environmentalist; writer; editor; publisher of Running Times magazine; author of God's Last Offer: Negotiating for a Sustainable Future and Crossing the Energy Divide: Moving from Fossil-Fuel Dependence to a Clean Energy Future
Peter Bart – Vice President and Editor-in-Chief of Variety
Lauren Belfer – author of novel City of Light
Peter Biskind – author of Easy Riders, Raging Bulls
David G. Bradley – chair of The Atlantic Monthly and National Journal Group, Inc.
Ben Brantley – chief theater critic of The New York Times
Amy Fine Collins – author and contributor at Vanity Fair
Heywood Hale Broun – sportswriter and CBS Sports commentator
Arthur Chu – columnist and former contestant on Jeopardy! 
Diane Di Prima – Beat generation poet
Kurt Eichenwald – New York Times reporter and author of books on white-collar crime (Serpent on the Rock, The Informant, Conspiracy of Fools)
Julie Falk (1998) – Executive Director of Bitch Media
Jessica Fisher – poet, translator, critic; winner of the Rome Prize and Yale Series of Younger Poets
Jonathan Franzen – author of The Corrections; winner of the 2001 National Book Award for Fiction 
Daisy Fried (1989) – poet, author of My Brother is Getting Arrested Again and She Didn't Mean to Do It
Gregory Gibson – author of Gone Boy, Demon of the Waters, and Hubert’s Freaks
Justin Hall – pioneer blogger
Adam Haslett (1992) – author of You Are Not a Stranger Here (Pulitzer Prize finalist, National Book Award finalist, and 2002 L. L. Winship/PEN New England Award winner); stories in The New Yorker, The Nation, The Atlantic Monthly, Zoetrope All-Story, and National Public Radio’s Selected Shorts
Arlie Russell Hochschild, sociologist and author
Marni Hodgkin, children's book editor tech
Anick Jesdanun (1991), technology reporter, editor, and the first "internet writer" in the history of the Associated Press history
Josef Joffe – Editor in Chief, Die Zeit
John Brady Kiesling – writer, former U.S. diplomat
Christopher Lehmann-Haupt – journalist, book review and obit editor for New York Times
Cynthia Leive – Editor in Chief, Glamour
Helen Reimensnyder Martin (1868–1939) – novelist
Daniel Menaker – fiction editor, The New Yorker, and Executive Editor-in-Chief, Random House
James A. Michener – novelist
Lulu Miller – writer, artist, and science reporter for National Public Radio
Victor Navasky – publisher and Editorial Director of The Nation (1995–2005); Chair of Columbia Journalism Review
Yongsoo Park (1994) - novelist; author of the novels Boy Genius, Las Cucarachas, the essay collection The Art of Eating Bitter : a Hausfrau Dad's Journey with Kids, and the memoir Rated R Boy: Growing Up Korean in 1980s Queens
Drew Pearson – journalist
Jon Raymond – novelist, short story writer, and co-writer of the films Old Joy and Wendy and Lucy
Rishi Reddi – short story writer
Rudy Rucker – cyberpunk novelist; winner of two Philip K. Dick Awards
Norman Rush – novelist, winner of the 1991 National Book Award for Mating
William Saletan – Chief National Correspondent for Slate.com; author of Bearing Right: How Conservatives Won the Abortion War
Anna Shechtman – journalist and crossword compiler
Kenneth Turan – film critic of The Los Angeles Times
Mark Vonnegut –  physician and author, son of Kurt Vonnegut; his memoir of schizophrenia The Eden Express opens with his Swarthmore graduation
Nora Waln – journalist and memoirist on China and Nazi Germany
Micah White – creator of Occupy Wall Street
Mary Wiltenburg – journalist
Valerie Worth (d. 1994) – poet and writer; especially known for her children's poems
Rowan Ricardo Phillips – poet and writer; author of Living Weapon: Poems and The Circuit: A Tennis Odyssey

College leadership

Presidents
 Valerie Smith, 2015–
 Rebecca Chopp, 2009–2014
 Alfred H. Bloom, 1991–2009
 David W. Fraser, 1982–1991
 Theodore W. Friend, 1973–1982
 Robert D. Cross, 1969–1971
 Courtney C. Smith, 1953–1969
 John W. Nason, 1940–1953
 Frank Aydelotte, 1921–1940
 Joseph Swain, 1902–1921
 William W. Birdsall, 1898–1902
 Charles De Garmo, 1891–1898
 William Hyde Appleton, 1889–1891
 Edward Hicks Magill, 1871–1889
 Edward Parrish, 1865–1871

Notable professors

Current faculty
Alan Baker, philosophy
Amanda Bayer, economics
Barry Schwartz, psychology 
Theodore B. Fernald, linguistics
K. David Harrison, linguistics
Gerald Levinson, music
Donna Jo Napoli, linguistics
Ron Tarver, art and art history
Andrea Lee, English literature
Chinelo Okparanta, English literature
Nathalie Anderson, English literature
James Magruder, theatre
Joseph Church, music
Theodore B. Fernald, linguistics
K. David Harrison, linguistics and cognitive science
Rodney Evans, film and media studies
Mark I. Wallace, religion, environmental studies
Aimee Johnson, mathematics and statistics

Former faculty
Solomon Asch, psychology
W. H. Auden (poet), literature 
Monroe Beardsley, philosophy
Brand Blanshard, philosophy
Daniel J. Boorstin, history
Richard Brandt, philosophy
Ralph Bunche, political science 
Bruce Cumings, international relations
Robert Gallucci
Kenneth Gergen, psychology
Lila R. Gleitman, linguistics
Harold Clarke Goddard, English, Shakespeare studies
Frank Hastings Griffin, chemistry
Rush D. Holt, Jr., physics
Raymond F. Hopkins, political science
Jennie Keith, anthropology
Nannerl O. Keohane, political science
Robert Keohane, political science
Wolfgang Köhler, psychology
James Kurth, political science, editor of Orbis
Joseph Leidy, natural history
George W. Lewis, engineering
Kenneth Lieberthal, political science
Louis Massiah, black studies, film and media studies
Judith Moffett, English
Jonathan D. Moreno
Scott Nearing, economics
Harold E. Pagliaro, English
Frederic Pryor, economics
Maria L. Sanford, history
Barry Schwartz, psychology
Wolfgang F. Stolper, economics
Judith G. Voet, chemistry and biochemistry
Hans Wallach, psychology
Kenneth Waltz, political science
Clair Wilcox, economics
Michael Marissen, music
James Freeman, music
Ann McNamee, music
James Kurth, political science
Philip Jefferson, economics
Scott F. Gilbert, biology

References

Lists of people by university or college in Pennsylvania